Ancistrocladus tectorius is a species in the monogeneric family Ancistrocladaceae found in China (Hainan), Cambodia, India (Andaman and Nicobar Islands), Indonesia, Laos, Malaysia, Myanmar, Singapore, Thailand, and Vietnam.

Description and Uses
These are palaeotropical, climbing, twining plants or lianas, found in lowland to sub-montane, wet evergreen to seasonal tropical forests in valleys and on slopes from sea level to 1600 m. Good specimens can be found in Đồng Nai Province, where leaves are used as roofing material (implied in the Vietnamese name) and a traditional haemostatic by minority Ma people.

References

External links
 

Ancistrocladaceae
Flora of Hainan
Flora of Indo-China
Flora of Sumatra
Flora of Peninsular Malaysia
Flora of Borneo
Plants described in 1790